Petrich Municipality is a municipality in Blagoevgrad Province in Southwestern Bulgaria. It had a population of 47,949 at the 2021 Census.

Religion 
According to the latest Bulgarian census of 2011, the religious composition, among those who answered the optional question on religious identification, was the following:

List of villages 
The following lists the 55 villages in the municipality:

References

External links

Municipalities in Blagoevgrad Province